The Brook Road Marker, Jefferson Davis Highway is a commemorative marker on the Jefferson Davis Highway, in Henrico County, Virginia, outside of Richmond, Virginia.  The Jefferson Davis Highway was conceived and marked by the United Daughters of the Confederacy, as a counter to the Lincoln Highway in the north, during 1913–1925.  In that era, named highways were being marked as automobile travel increased, and the advent of numbered highways eventually loomed.  The marker was placed in North Richmond Brook Road, south of Hilliard Road, in 1927.  It is one of the earliest, out of 16, that were placed to mark the highway in Virginia by the United Daughters of the Confederacy.  It is a  gray granite stone, with a slanted top, and a bronze plaque.

It is one of a number of markers studied in a National Park Service study, UDC Commemorative Highway Markers along the Jefferson Davis Highway in Virginia.

References

Confederate States of America monuments and memorials in Virginia
Buildings and structures in Henrico County, Virginia
Buildings and structures completed in 1927
Individual signs on the National Register of Historic Places
Individual signs in the United States
Jefferson Davis Highway
Monuments and memorials on the National Register of Historic Places in Virginia
National Register of Historic Places in Henrico County, Virginia
Road transportation buildings and structures on the National Register of Historic Places
Transportation buildings and structures on the National Register of Historic Places in Virginia
United Daughters of the Confederacy monuments and memorials
1927 establishments in Virginia